My Old Man's Place (also known as Glory Boy or The Old Man's Place) is a 1971 American war drama film directed by Edwin Sherin and starring Arthur Kennedy, Mitchell Ryan, William Devane, Michael Moriarty, and Topo Swope. The film was released by Cinerama Releasing Corporation on June 29, 1971.

Plot

Cast
 Arthur Kennedy as Walter Pell
 Mitchell Ryan as Sergeant Martin Flood (as Mitch Ryan)
 William Devane as Jimmy Pilgrim
 Michael Moriarty as Trubee Pell
 Topo Swope as Helen
 Lloyd Gough as Dr. Paul
 Ford Rainey as Sheriff Coleman
 Peter Donat as Car Salesman
 Sandra Vacey as Darlene Pilgrim
 Paula Kauffman as "Bubbles"
 Eve Marchand as Streetwalker
 Bud Walls as Marine
 Harvey Brumfield as M.P.

References

External links

1970s war drama films
American war drama films
1971 films
Cinerama Releasing Corporation films
1971 drama films
1970s English-language films
1970s American films